The 2023 Teréga Open Pau–Pyrénées was a professional tennis tournament played on indoor hard courts. It was the fifth edition of the tournament which was part of the 2023 ATP Challenger Tour. It took place in Pau, France between 27 February and 5 March 2023.

Singles main-draw entrants

Seeds

 1 Rankings are as of 20 February 2023.

Other entrants
The following players received wildcards into the singles main draw:
  Gabriel Debru
  Calvin Hemery
  Mark Lajal

The following players received entry into the singles main draw as alternates:
  Antoine Escoffier
  Li Tu
  Kaichi Uchida

The following players received entry from the qualifying draw:
  Ugo Blanchet
  Mathias Bourgue
  Bu Yunchaokete
  Joris De Loore
  Evgeny Donskoy
  Valentin Royer

The following players received entry as lucky losers:
  Dan Added
  Louis Wessels

Champions

Singles

 Luca Van Assche def.  Ugo Humbert 7–6(7–5), 4–6, 7–6(8–6).

Doubles

 Dan Added /  Albano Olivetti def.  Julian Cash /  Constantin Frantzen 3–6, 6–1, [10–8].

References

Teréga Open Pau-Pyrénées
2023 in French tennis
February 2023 sports events in France
March 2023 sports events in France